Irma Morales Muñoz (born August 20, 1936) is a Mexican former professional wrestler, referred to as a luchadora in Spanish, known primarily under her ring name Irma González. During her over forty-year career, from the 1950s to the 1990s, she also competed at various times under the masked characters Flor Negra ("Black Flower"), Rosa Blanca ("White Rose"), La Tirana ("The Tyrant"), La Dama del Enfermero ("The Nurse Lady"), La Enfermera ("The Nurse") and La Novia del Santo ("The Bride of El Santo").

She is one of the pioneers of women's professional wrestling in Mexico, part of the first wave of Mexican women who made their debuts in the early 1950s, at a time where virtually no women's matches were promoted in Mexico. She is a five-time holder of the Mexican National Women's Championship, a two-time winner of the UWA World Women's Championship, and won both a US-based and an Indonesian-based world championship. She and her daughter Irma Aguilar were the first team to win the Mexican National Women's Tag Team Championship when introduced in 1990.

Professional wrestling
Women's wrestling in Mexico prior to the 1950s was almost non-existent, with no known matches taking place from 1945 on and very few prior to that. In the early 1950s Jack O'Brien began training female wrestlers, including Irma Morales, in his gym in León, Guanajuato. Morales worked under the ring name Irma González alongside other O'Brien trainees such as Chabela Romero, La Enfermera, La Dama Enmascarada, and Rosita Williams. On February 28, 1955, González defeated La Dama Enmascarada to win the Mexican National Women's Championship, becoming the second overall champion. Her reign lasted for 489 days, until Rosita Williams won the championship on June 12, 1956. González regained the championship in 1958, although records are unclear as to whom she defeated to win the title. Her second reign came to an when she lost it to La Dama Enmascarada on September 28, 1958.

The rivalry between González and La Dama Enmascarada led to the first decisive Lucha de Apuestas ("betting match") in Mexico, 18 years after the first one took place. The match saw González defeat La Dama, forcing her to unmask and reveal her real name as required by the rules, making her the first woman to do so in Mexico. González had a third reign with the  championship in 1959. Records indicate that she held and defended the championship, but not who she fought to win it or to whom she lost it. In the late 1950s, Ernesto P. Uruchurtu, Regent of Mexico City, banned women's wrestling in the city effectively relegating women to minor shows in other Mexican states. In 1961, La Dama Enmascarada once again wrestled Irma González in a  Lucha de Apuestas, but this time won, forcing González to have all of her hair shaved off as a result.

In the early 1960s, Morales became engaged and promised her fiancé that she would stop wrestling. Instead of retiring Morales began working under a mask, using a ring character named "La Novia del Santo" ("The Bride of El Santo"), wearing El Santo's signature silver mask. Morales obtained El Santo's blessing to use the name. She is the only non-family member ever to be given the right to use the Santo name. Morales wrestled as "La Novia del Santo" for seven months until she married and temporarily retired. It is unclear for how long she was retired, but records indicate that Irma González lost the Mexican National Women's Championship to Chabela Romero on an Empresa Mexicana de Lucha Libre (EMLL) show in Guadalajara, Mexico. She also won the mask of La India on a show in Torreón, Coahuila, Mexico. At EMLL's Carnaval de Campeones show, Chabela Romero successfully defended the women's championship against Irma González.

During the 1960s and 1970s Morales worked as various masked wrestlers, including "Flor Negra" ("Black Flower"), "Rosa Blanca" ("White Rose"), "La Tirana" ("The Tyrant"), "La Dama del Enfermero" ("The Nurse Lady"), and "La Enfermera" ("The Nurse"). In the 1970s, she focused more on storyline rivalries instead of championship matches, especially against her longtime rival Chabela Romero. The two met in three separate Lucha de Apuestas matches through the 1970s, in 1971, 1974 and 1979, with González emerging victorious each time.

On May 25, 1980, González defeated US-born Vicky Williams to win the Universal Wrestling Association's Women's World Championship for the first time. Her initial reign lasted 133 days, until October 5, when Williams regained the championship. At some point in 1980 González also won the Mexican National Women's Championship again, but records are unclear who she took the title from; they do indicate that Rossy Moreno won the championship from González in 1980. In 1981, Irma González won the mask of Martha la Sarapera and followed up by winning Martha's hair in 1982. That same year also saw González defeat La Mujer X at a regional show in Xalapa, Veracruz to unmask her. She also won the UWA World Women's Championship for a second time, defeating Lola González on August 27, 1982. Her 210-day reign ended on May 25, 1983, when Lola González regained the championship.

Records indicate that González once again held the Mexican National Women's Championship in 1986, but the details are scarce. Later that year women's wrestling was allowed in Mexico City once more, bringing González and others back to the nation's capital. In August 1990, González and her daughter Irma Aguilar, teamed up to become the first team to win the Mexican National Women's Tag Team Championship, defeating Neftali and Satanakia in the tournament's finals. The mother/daughter duo held the championship for 497 days, until December 20, 1991, when the team of Martha Villalobos and Pantera Sureña defeated them for it. In 1995, at age 59, González, Irma Aguilar and La Sierenita competed in the first match of Triplemanía III-A, AAA's biggest show of the year, losing to La Nazi, Martha Villalobos and Neftali. Her last confirmed match took place on April 13, 1996, at a Promo Azteca show in Mexico City. She teamed up with her daughter to defeat La Chola and La Rebelde.

Championships and accomplishments
Empresa Mexicana de Lucha Libre
Mexican National Women's Championship (5 times)
Mexican National Women's Tag Team Championship (1 time, first) – with Irma Aguilar
Universal Wrestling Association
UWA World Women's Championship (2 times)
Other
World Women's Championship (US version) (1 time)
World Women's Championship (Indonesia version) (1 time)

Luchas de Apuestas record

References

1936 births
20th-century professional wrestlers
Living people
Mexican female professional wrestlers
People from Ciudad Juárez
Professional wrestlers from Chihuahua (state)
Mexican National Women's Champions
Mexican National Women's Tag Team Champions